Kent Jones may refer to:

H. Kent Jones (1926–1995), American politician from North Dakota
Kent Jones (writer) (born 1964),  American television and radio writer and producer
Kent Jones (golfer) (born 1967), American professional golfer 
Kent Jones (rapper) (born 1993), American rapper
Kent Jones (critic) (born 1957), director of New York Film Festival, film critic and director of Hitchcock/Truffaut